Perttilä is a surname originating in Finland. Notable people with the surname include:

Emil Perttilä (1875–1933), Finnish politician
, Finnish musician playing with Barren Earth and Rytmihäiriö bands
Matti Perttilä (1896–1968), Finnish wrestler
Valfrid Perttilä (1878–1953), Finnish politician

Finnish-language surnames